Jack Emmert is an American game designer who has worked primarily on role-playing games and computer games.

Career
Jack Emmert had been playing Champions since it came out in 1981. Emmert spent his teenage years reading comic books and playing AD&D. During his student years, Emmert wrote several pen and paper RPG supplements to make ends meet. After a lengthy stint in academia, Emmert co-founded Cryptic Studios. He designed the MMORPGs City of Heroes and City of Villains. Emmert was the chief creative officer and directed the design of all games from Cryptic Studios, and was involved in the development of Marvel Universe Online. Emmert and the rest of Cryptic later decided that Champions would be a great replacement for the Marvel Comics IP they had lost, thus Cryptic purchased the Champions game and the Champions universe from Hero Games in 2008. Emmert was the online producer for Star Trek Online.

In March 2010, Bill Roper was promoted to chief creative officer, succeeding Emmert (who became the chief operations officer). In March 2011, Emmert was promoted to chief executive officer when John Needham left to pursue other opportunities in the gaming industry.

On June 8, 2016, Jack Emmert was made CEO of Daybreak Game Company Austin's Texas-based studio, as the head of the Daybreak Games studio responsible for the Action Combat MMORPG DC Universe Online (DCUO), Emmert will oversee all development in Austin and will report into Daybreak headquarters in San Diego.

In May 2022, Emmert was put in charge of NetEase's new US-based studio, Jackalope Games.

References

External links
 Jack Emmert :: Pen & Paper RPG Database archive

Living people
Place of birth missing (living people)
Role-playing game designers
Year of birth missing (living people)